The Ziemowit coal mine is a large mine in the south of Poland in Lędziny, Silesian Voivodeship, 310 km south-west of the capital, Warsaw. Ziemowit represents one of the largest coal reserves in Poland having estimated reserves of 133 million tonnes of coal. The annual coal production is around 4.5 million tonnes.

References

External links 
 Official site

Coal mines in Poland
Bieruń-Lędziny County
Coal mines in Silesian Voivodeship